Sanjeev Arora is an Indian businessman  and politician  from Aam Aadmi Party who is nominated for the upper house in the Indian parliament, Rajya Sabha. No opposition candidate opposed his election. His term in the Rajya Sabha as a member from Punjab tenure starting from 10 April 2022.

Businesses

Arora's primary business is in the export industry, where he has been running Ritesh Industries Ltd for the last three decades. The company exports primarily to the USA and has an office in Virginia. In 2006, he diversified into real estate and changed the name of his company to Ritesh Properties and Industries Ltd (RPIL). Arora has developed the state-of-the-art Hampton Business Park and Hampton Homes on Chandigarh Road, which serves as a hub for 70 industries. In 2018, he founded the woman-wear brand, Femella, after launching the company Femella Fashions Ltd. He also ventured into the non-ferrous metal business Teneron Limited in 2019, which has a partnership with Suzuki Motors under the Make in India scheme.

Family

Sanjeev Arora has a strong connection to his family, particularly his parents who he lost to cancer. In memory of them, he established the ‘Krishna Pran Breast Cancer Charitable Trust’ which has provided free treatment to 160 cancer patients over the last 15 years.

Other positions and contributions

Arora is a dedicated philanthropist who is actively involved in several social and cultural organizations. He is on the governing board of Dayanand Medical College & Hospital and is a member of the Apex Council of Punjab Cricket Association and Ved Mandir Trust, Daresi. He has also served two consecutive terms as the secretary of the Sutlej Club. These activities reflect his commitment to giving back to society and his passion for making a positive impact.

References

 

  
  

Living people
Rajya Sabha members from Punjab, India
Aam Aadmi Party politicians from Punjab, India
Rajya Sabha members from Aam Aadmi Party
Year of birth missing (living people)